Bishop Juan Alberto de la Merced Martín y Villaverde (2 May 1904 – 3 November 1960) was Bishop of the Roman Catholic Diocese of Matanzas (1938–1960).

Bishop Martin was ordained a priest on October 27, 1927.  He was appointed bishop of the Diocese of Matanzas by Pope Pius XI on May 14, 1938, and was consecrated in the Cathedral of Matanzas on July 3, 1938, when he was 34 years old.  His principal consecrator was Archbishop José Manuel Dámaso Rúiz y Rodríguez of the Archdiocese of Havana and as co-consecrators,  Archbishop Enrique Pérez Serantes of the Archdiocese of Santiago de Cuba and Bishop Eduardo Pedro Martínez y Dalmau, C.P. of the Diocese of Cienfuegos.  Bishop Martin died on November 3, 1960, at the age of 56.

References
 Episcopologio de la Iglesia Católica en Cuba bio 
 Catholic Hierarchy bio

1904 births
1960 deaths
20th-century Roman Catholic bishops in Cuba
Roman Catholic bishops of Matanzas